The Arizona Kid is a 1988 novel by Ron Koertge about a summer 16-year-old Billy spends living with his gay uncle and working with racehorses.

Characters
 Billy Kennedy: a 16-year-old from Missouri
 Uncle Wes: Billy's uncle and mentor
 Jack: a horse trainer who expresses himself through the toupee he chooses to wear
 Lew: a co-worker and friend of Billy's
 Cara Mae: an outspoken racehorse rider who develops a relationship with Billy

Reception

Reviews
The American Library Association designated the book a "Best of the Best Books for Young Adults" in 1988.  The School Library Journal praised it, saying "Koertge's marvelous wit (also evident in Where the Kissing Never Stops Little, 1987) out of the mouth of his young hero is a delight, and his compassion for and understanding of Wes and Billy and his summer friends shapes a funny but affecting novel."  The book also received positive reviews from Publishers Weekly and the Emergency Librarian.

Criticism
The book is number seventy-five on the American Library Association's list of the top 100 most frequently challenged books from 1990 to 1999.

See also
 List of most commonly challenged books in the U.S.

References 

1988 American novels
American LGBT novels
American young adult novels
American bildungsromans
Gay male teen fiction
1980s LGBT novels
Horse racing novels
Novels set in Tucson, Arizona
LGBT-related young adult novels
Censored books